"Ramuloo Ramulaa" is an Indian Telugu-language song composed by S. Thaman for the soundtrack of the 2020 action-drama film Ala Vaikunthapurramuloo sung by Anurag Kulkarni and Mangli and penned by Kasarla Shyam. The song's official lyrical version was released on 25 October 2019, while the full video song was released on 28 February 2020 under the music label Aditya Music.

Release 
The song teaser of the second single "Ramuloo Ramulaa" was released on 21 October 2019. The lyrics for the song written by Kasarla Shyam and sung by Anurag Kulkarni and Mangli Satyavati. The single was released on 25 October 2019, with the occasion of Diwali. The YouTube video included lyrics, footage of the musicians, an Allu Arjun voice-over, clips of the actual dance number from the movie, behind the scenes footage, and members of the cast wishing fans a happy Diwali at the end.

Music video 
The music video version of the single was officially released on 28 February 2020 under Aditya Music label. The music video features Allu Arjun and Pooja Hegde dancing for the single. The music is choreographed by Sekhar, a well-known choreographer from Tollywood. The video garned lot of views due to its music and choreography.

Reception

Audience response 
Allu Arjun's dance moves in the music video got wide response which is choreographed by Sekhar. Also the female vocalist of the song, Mangli got a breakthrough with this single.

Critics review 
Cinejosh wrote that "Anurag Kulkarni and Mangli crooned the song for which lyrics are penned by Kasarla Shyam. Allu Arjun's stylish looks, expensive sets and most importantly the pleasing tune composed by S Thaman makes this an instant hit."

Tollywood.net stated that "'Ramulo Raamulaa' is a peppy number in Telangana slang. The teaser of this song gives a glimpse of film actress Pooja Hegde grooving to the beats. Allu Arjun's steps and Pooja Hegde's glamour are likely to be the highlight of the song."

123telugu on reviewing the music album of the film wrote that "The song has a folk touch, with Thaman's peppy composition and beats. We can expect some cool moves from Bunny, Pooja and others in this number."

IndiaGlitz wrote about the song that "The folksy lyrics get just the kind of musical vibes that a star vehicle needed. Combined with the crooning prowess of Anurag Kulkarni, this one delivers a dekko. Mangli's voice adds to the rustic feel."

Records 
As of November 2020, the lyrical version of the song has over 335 million (33.5 crore) views, which makes it the most-viewed lyrical song in india on YouTube, whereas the full video song has over 440 million (44 crore) views on YouTube. In December 2019, it became the second fastest Telugu song followed by "Samajavaraagamana" to cross 100 million views.

The single also became a chartbuster in Telugu music charts on many music-streaming services, especially on Amazon Prime Music, Gaana, JioSaavn, Spotify.

Other versions 
The lyrical version of the song was later released on 21 December 2019, in Malayalam with the title as "Aanddava Aanddava" for the film's Malayalam version, with Hanuman and Nayana performing the song instead of Anurag Kulkarni and Mangli. While, the full video version of "Aanddava Aanddava" song was released on 16 May 2020. Nakash Aziz and Urmila Dhangar sang the Hindi version.

References

External links 
 
 

2019 songs
Telugu film songs
Telugu-language songs
Filmi songs
Indian songs
Indian film songs
Songs from Ala Vaikunthapurramuloo
Songs with music by S. Thaman